In old English law, a capite (from Latin caput, head) was a tenure, abolished by Act 12 Chas. II, xxiv. (Tenures Abolition Act 1660), by which either person or land was held immediately of the king, or of his crown, either by knight-service or socage. A holder of a capite is termed a tenant-in-chief.

References

 

Common law
English laws